Kosmos 334 ( meaning Cosmos 334), known before launch as DS-P1-Yu No.31, was a Soviet satellite which was launched in 1970 as part of the Dnepropetrovsk Sputnik programme. It was a  spacecraft, which was built by the Yuzhnoye Design Bureau, and was used as a radar calibration target for anti-ballistic missile tests.

Launch 
Kosmos 334 was launched from Site 133/1 at the Plesetsk Cosmodrome, atop a Kosmos-2I 63SM carrier rocket. The launch occurred on 23 April 1970 at 13:20:00 UTC, and resulted in the successful deployment of Kosmos 334 into low Earth orbit. Upon reaching orbit, it was assigned its Kosmos designation, and received the International Designator 1970-033A.

Orbit 
Kosmos 334 was the thirty-first of seventy nine DS-P1-Yu satellites to be launched, and the twenty-ninth of seventy two to successfully reach orbit. It remained in orbit until it decayed and reentered the atmosphere on 9 August 1970.

References

Kosmos satellites
Spacecraft launched in 1970
1970 in the Soviet Union
Dnepropetrovsk Sputnik program